Health Policy and Planning is a peer-reviewed scientific journal covering the study of health policy and health services. It was established in 1986 and is published 10 times per year by Oxford University Press in association with the London School of Hygiene and Tropical Medicine. The editors-in-chief are Sandra Mounier-Jack and Virginia Wiseman (London School of Hygiene and Tropical Medicine). According to the Journal Citation Reports, the journal has a 2018 impact factor of 2.717, ranking it 29th out of 98 journals in the category "Health Care Sciences & Services".

References

External links

Publications established in 1986
Oxford University Press academic journals
English-language journals
10 times per year journals
Health policy journals
Healthcare journals